Bangalore railway division is one of the three railway divisions under South Western Railway zone of Indian Railways. This railway division was formed in 1971 and its headquarter is located at Bangalore in the state of Karnataka of India.

Mysuru railway division, and Hubballi railway division are the other railway divisions under SWR Zone headquartered at Hubballi.

The overall in charge of Bangalore Division, the Divisional Railway Manager (DRM) is Shyam Singh.

List of railway stations and towns 
The list includes the stations under the Bangalore railway division and their station category.

Stations closed for Passengers - 

Thanisandra Station

References

 
Divisions of Indian Railways
1951 establishments in Mysore State